The Genesis is a 2002 album released by Yngwie J. Malmsteen. It consists of very early recordings (around the time when Malmsteen was seventeen years old), and many of these tracks were reworked for compositions on albums throughout his career. This album is the official version of an album released by Marcel Jacob, Birth of the Sun, which was based on a 1980 demo of Malmsteen's.

Track listing

Personnel
Yngwie J. Malmsteen - guitars, bass guitar, vocals
Marcel Jacob - bass guitar (According to the liner notes, Malmsteen later re-recorded the bass himself).
Zepp Urgard - drums

References

2002 albums
Yngwie Malmsteen albums